The Senior League World Series Caribbean Region is one of six International regions that currently sends teams to the World Series in Easley, South Carolina. The region's participation in the SLWS dates back to 2017. The region was the result of the Latin America region splitting in two.

Caribbean Region Countries

Region Champions
As of the 2022 Senior League World Series.

Results by Country
As of the 2022 Senior League World Series.

See also
Caribbean Region in other Little League divisions
Little League – Latin America
Little League – Mexico
Little League – Caribbean
Intermediate League – Latin America
Junior League – Latin America
Big League – Latin America

References

Caribbean
Baseball in the Caribbean